Ameer Hamza  (Pashto), commonly known as Hamza Baba (Pashto), was a prominent Pakistani Pashto and Urdu language poet. His books are taught on master levels in University of Peshawar. He is considered a bridge between classic Pashto literature and modern literature. He founded Khyber School of thought in Pashto literature. Most notable poets of this school of thought like Nazir Shinwari, Khatir Afridi, Khyber Afridi were his pupils.

Early life 
Shinwari was born in Landi Kotal, Khyber district, as the fifth son of Brameer Khan.

In 1915, he enrolled in a primary school. When the teacher asked him to write the Urdu alphabet he instead displayed his artistic abilities and drew a human figure.

He went to Islamia Collegiate School in the fifth grade and started writing poetry in Urdu. Once his teacher Khawaja Syed Abdul Sattar Shah advised him to write in his mother tongue Pashto. As he was not proficient in Urdu, he obeyed his teacher's instructions and began writing in Pashto.

Career 
When Shinwari worked on the railways, he had very little money. He received a low-income certificate and quit. He travelled to Mumbai to work in the film industry, but failed to establish himself. Hamza was inspired by Mirza Khan Ansari and Khushal Khan Khattak. In the early 1940s, his poetry focused on romanticism. He wrote about different aspects of romance.

Hamza was also a critic and a playwright, producing 200 plays for Radio Pakistan, features, critical essays, and research papers for different literary newspapers of Pakistan.

Influence 
He belonged to the Shinwari tribe of the ethnic Pashtuns. His work is considered a fusion between classic and modern poetry. He wrote classical poetry, blended it with recent innovations, and introduced new ideas in Pashto Ghazals. He is also known as the father of Pashto Ghazals.

Personal life 
Hamza lived in Landi Kotal; his home was in Muhalla Sakhi Shah Mardan. He died in February 1994 and is buried in Khyber Agency.

He lived for almost more than 30 years in Mardan, Khyber Pakhtunkhwa.

References

External links
 Shinwari poem "ځم" at Chakdara.com

Pashto-language poets
Pashtun people
Pakistani poets
Pashtun Sufis
Recipients of the Pride of Performance
1907 births
1994 deaths
People from Khyber District